

Werner von Eichstedt (1 January 1896 – 26 August 1944) was a German general (Generalmajor) in the Wehrmacht during World War II. He was a recipient of the Knight's Cross of the Iron Cross of Nazi Germany. Eichstedt was killed on 26 August 1944 near Kishinev, Moldova during the Soviet Second Jassy–Kishinev Offensive.

Awards and decorations

 Knight's Cross of the Iron Cross on 16 November 1943 as Oberst and commander of Artillerie-Regiment 306

References

Citations

Bibliography

 
 

1896 births
1944 deaths
People from Steinfurt (district)
Major generals of the German Army (Wehrmacht)
People from the Province of Westphalia
Recipients of the clasp to the Iron Cross, 1st class
Recipients of the Knight's Cross of the Iron Cross
German Army personnel killed in World War II
German prisoners of war in World War I
World War I prisoners of war held by France
Prussian Army personnel
Reichswehr personnel
Military personnel from North Rhine-Westphalia